The scaly osman (Diptychus maculatus) is a species of cyprinid freshwater fish. It is native to Himalaya and the Tibetan Plateau of China, India, Nepal and Pakistan, ranging west to the Tien Shan Mountains and Central Asia.

References

Diptychus
Fish described in 1866